Pocket Coffee is a brand of the Ferrero company for a chocolate confectionery, sold internationally. First marketed in Italy in 1968, each Pocket Coffee is an individually wrapped shell of dark chocolate containing liquid espresso. As with Ferrero's Rocher, Mon Chéri, and Raffaello, production limits sales from November to April.

William Salice, assistant to Ferrero's owner, Michele Ferrero, conceived the product in the early 1960s after noticing no bars at Italy's then relatively new Autogrills, a proprietary eponym synonymous with Italian highway rest stops. Ferrero conceived a product for anyone working long hours, e.g., truck drivers. Michele Ferrero conceived the slogan: "the energy of chocolate and the charge of coffee".

Ingredients 
 Coffee (sweetened liquid)
 Chocolate (paste)
 Chocolate milk
 Cocoa butter
 Cocoa paste
 Lactose

Availability 
Pocket Coffee is sold widely in Italy, with Ferrero headquarters in Alba, Piedmont; Germany is the second largest market.

For many years, it was difficult to obtain Pocket Coffee outside Europe but, the product is available online and in certain major food markets.

References

External links 
 

Ferrero SpA brands